22-Dihydroergocalciferol is a form of vitamin D, also known as vitamin D4. It has the systematic name (5Z,7E)-(3S)-9,10-seco-5,7,10(19)-ergostatrien-3-ol.

Vitamin D4 is found in certain mushrooms, being produced from ergosta-5,7-dienol (22,23-dihydroergosterol) instead of ergosterol.

See also
Forms of vitamin D, the five known forms of vitamin D
Hypervitaminosis D, vitamin D poisoning
Lumisterol, a constituent of vitamin D1

References

External links
Dihydroergocalciferols at lipidmaps.org

Vitamin D